Rohith Abraham (born 19 July 1987), known professionally as ofRo, is a record producer, singer and songwriter who has worked with Asal Kolaar, Madan Gowri, Sandy, Santhosh Narayanan, Pradeep Kumar, Arivu, Durai, Tenma, ADK, Roshan Jamrock, Psychomantra, and Ben Human, among others. He is the co-founder of Atti Culture, a record label and production company & Madras Medai, a music festival and conference focusing on the growth of independent music in South India.

Early years 
Rohith was born in Chennai, India, and grew up there. He started playing piano at the age of 7 and began learning on electronic instruments soon after. He began taking music seriously in 2005 with his band Nerverek. After he graduated from Loyola College, he moved to Byron Bay, Australia, to further hone his music production skills. He graduated from SAE Institute in 2013.

Career 
In 2014, he began his career working for Harris Jayaraj as an additional programmer for the movie Yennai Arindhaal. 

In 2017, he began his independent music career with his first music video, October Maadham, which featured Instagram model Sameea Bangera, Directed by Ken Royson.

In 2019, he wrote and produced the critically acclaimed, Therukural, a tamil hiphop album with tamil rapper Arivu featuring Tenma and Roshan Jamrock. The album touched topics of caste and class divide in India. The album was highly acclaimed, featured in Rolling Stone India as the top ten Indian albums in 2019 and 5 most politically conscious hiphop in India. Arivu and ofRo performed their first song, Anti Indian at Madras Medai in 2018. He founded Therukural with Arivu, as community for artists and creatives. They would gather with hundreds of young artists, songwriters, beatboxers and more, at public parks to share ideas, songs and more. ofRo's slick production is apparent in songs like Kalla Mouni and Anti Indian. 

He met ADK, a Sri lankan rapper in Harris Jayaraj's studio in 2015, but it wasn't until 4 years later when they would work together on a song called Lityananda - a satirical piece commenting on self proclaimed godmen. 

Along with co-founder and music director, Tenma, he curates Madras Medai, a premier South Indian independent music festival with the aim to build an ecosystem for future independent artists. Madras Medai was first conducted at CSI Bains School on 19 May 2018. It featured performances by artists like Dopeadelicz, Dharavi United, Sunshine Orchestra, Siennor, Othasevuru, Jatayu, Arivu x ofRo, The Casteless Collective, Chinna Ponnu and Paul Jacob.

In 2019, Atti Culture was founded as an independent record label. The label focuses on nurturing and promoting up-and-coming Tamil talent. Known for its innovative approach to artist development and emphasis on creative freedom, Atti Culture has quickly gained a reputation for being a leading force in the modern music landscape of South India. 

ofRo quickly garnered attention for his songs with singer songwriter rapper Asal Kolaar. Jorthaale and Adi Odi became mainstream hits. Known for their electrifying chemistry, the duo has produced multiple hit songs, including the chart-topping singles "Jorthaale" and "Adi Odi." Their unique blend of genres and ability to create infectious melodies has earned them international acclaim and a dedicated fanbase. They performed live at Behindwoods.

Jorthaale's hypnotic beats and unique vocals quickly gained traction, propelling the single to massive success in the Tamil music domain. Jorthaale received "Viral Song of the Year" awards at Black Sheep awards solidifying the duo's status as a powerhouse in the music industry.

In 2022, ofRo and Asal Kolaar released their follow-up single, "Adi Odi." Building on the success of "Jorthaale," the track further explored their fusion of diverse genres, incorporating elements of Tamil folk, hip-hop, and electronic dance music. "Adi Odi" became an instant hit and a crowd favourite. 

In 2023, ofRo and his long time collaborator, Ken Royson, released "Durai Sleeping" as the debut song of artist, Durai. It was released on Think Music Originals.

Discography

References

External links

1987 births
Living people
Tamil musicians
Indian musicians